Tinakula is a conical stratovolcano which forms an island north of Nendo in Temotu Province, Solomon Islands. It lies at the north end of the Santa Cruz Islands. The volcano was first recorded in eruption in 1595 when Álvaro de Mendaña sailed past it.

History and occupation
The island is uninhabited. A population was eradicated when the volcano erupted around 1840 and pyroclastic flows swept all sides of the island. In 1951, polynesians from Nukapu and Nupani settled on the island, which reached a peak population of 130, before it had to be evacuated with the 1971 eruption. The village of Temateneni was on the southeast coast. In the late 1980s, two families (fewer than 10 people) from Nupani made another attempt at settlement.

The first recorded sighting by Europeans was by the Spanish expedition of Álvaro de Mendaña on 7 September 1595, when sailing towards Nendo Island where they stayed for several weeks. The volcano was described as lofty, with a well shaped peak, and a circumference of around 3 leagues (6.6km).

There is a brief reference in the Melbourne Age newspaper of 10 November 1868 of the journey of the barque Tycoon, a ship carrying tea from Foo Chow Foo to Melbourne for the Joshua Brothers. The ship, it states, "... passed Volcano Island, one of the South (Santa) Cruz Group, on the 17th of October (1868). It was then in active operation, vomiting forth immense volumes of fire and smoke."

See also

 List of volcanoes in the Solomon Islands
 List of islands
 Desert island

References and sources
References

Sources

External links
 Tinakula featured on Solomon Islands stamps

Active volcanoes
Mountains of the Solomon Islands
Stratovolcanoes of the Solomon Islands
Uninhabited islands of the Solomon Islands
Former populated places in Oceania
Holocene stratovolcanoes